The 1965 Sugar Bowl was the 31st edition of the college football bowl game, played at Tulane Stadium in New Orleans, Louisiana, on Friday, January 1. Part of the 1964–65 bowl season, it matched the seventh-ranked LSU Tigers of the Southeastern Conference (SEC) and the unranked independent Syracuse Orangemen. Favored LSU rallied in the second half to win, 13–10.  The game is notable for being the first time a racially integrated team played in the Sugar Bowl since the 1956 Sugar Bowl.  Syracuse had two black players, Jim Nance and Floyd Little.

Teams

LSU Tigers

Syracuse Orangemen

Game summary
Syracuse opened the scoring in the first quarter with a 23-yard Roger Smith field goal. When Syracuse got the ball next, LSU's defense forced a safety, as lineman George Rice tackled halfback Floyd Little in the end zone, making it 3–2. Syracuse's Bradlee Clarke returned a blocked punt 28 yards for a touchdown, and after a scoreless second quarter, Syracuse led 10–2 at halftime.

In the third quarter, LSU reserve quarterback Billy Ezell threw a 57-yard touchdown pass to Doug Moreau, and converted for two points on a pass play to tie the game at ten. With under four minutes remaining, Moreau kicked a 28-yard field goal to put LSU ahead, 13–10, which was the final score, and he was named Sugar Bowl MVP.

Scoring
First quarter
SYR – Roger Smith 23-yard field goal
LSU – Safety, Floyd Little tackled in end zone by George Rice
SYR – Bradlee Clarke 28-yard run after blocked punt (Smith kick)
Second quarter
No scoring
Third quarter
LSU – Doug Moreau 57-yard pass from Billy Ezell (Joe LaBruzzo pass from Ezell)
Fourth quarter
LSU – Moreau 28-yard field goal

Statistics
{| class=wikitable style="text-align:center"
! Statistics !! LSU !! Syracuse
|-
|First downs||11||10
|-
|Rushing||46–161||35–151
|-
|Passing||6–15–1||8–20–1
|-
|Passing yards||114||52
|-
|Total offense||61–275||55–203
|-
|Punts–avg.||9–36.2||6–37.5
|-
|Fumbles–lost||4–0||3–1
|-
|Turnovers||1||2
|-
|Penalties–yards||4–46||5–55
|}

References

Sugar Bowl
Sugar Bowl
LSU Tigers football bowl games
Syracuse Orange football bowl games
Sugar Bowl
Sugar Bowl